There You Are Again is an album by American singer-songwriter Livingston Taylor released by Whistling Dog Music on January 24, 2006. It ended a nine-year hiatus since his previous studio album. Glenn Rosenstein produced There You Are Again.

Tell Jesus (To Come to My House), one of the songs on the album, has been explained as follows:

Track listing

References

2006 albums
Livingston Taylor albums